Sudarshan Shah, also known as Raja Sudarshan Shah of Garhwal Kingdom, was the ruler and the founder of modern-day New Tehri city of Tehri district. He reigned the kingdom from 1804 - 1859. British army aided the king to reign the territory after royal army defeated Gorkha forces during the Battle of Khurbura.

Background and life 
After Sudarshan's father was killed in the battle of Khurbura, Sudarshan was not yet grown adult and he was captured by the invaders until British forces defeated Gorkhas and later freed him. He was then crowned as the king of Tehri where he began his reign under the influence of British forces. Shah was married to sister of Aniruddh Chand of Kangra in 1831, however he died without being blessed with a son.

Administration 
Sudarshan was a wise ruler and he shifted his capital from Srinagar, Uttarakhand to Tehri which is covered by the hills and rivers. Before the establishment of the new capital, there were no buildings in the area. He constructed first building called  "Purana Durbar Hall" where he used to carry out administrative reforms.

References

1859 deaths
Year of birth missing
19th-century Indian monarchs